Kantri is a 2008 Indian Telugu-language action film written and directed by Meher Ramesh, a protégé of director Puri Jagannadh and who had earlier worked on Kannada films. Jr. NTR, Hansika Motwani, and Tanisha Mukherjee star in the lead roles, while Prakash Raj, Ashish Vidyarthi, Mukesh Rishi, Sayaji Shinde, Kota Srinivasa Rao, Venu Madhav, Sunil, Brahmanandam, Subbaraju, and Ali play supporting roles. The film has been produced by Vyjayanthi Movies and C. Ashwini Dutt. The film was initially scheduled to release on 28 April 2008. However, it was released 12 days later. The film released on 9 May 2008. Upon release, Kantri received mixed to negative review but due to NTR's stardom, it managed to become an average grosser and performed well at the box office .

Kantri is also the first Indian film to feature a 3D animated character based on an actor.

Plot
NRI Krishna returns to his village with his wife and child to work for the upliftment of the village folk. However, when the family along with his old father, is on its way home with the money, PR Pothuraju (Prakash Raj) betrays everyone by killing them and running away with the money, leaving his wife and son behind. Pothuraju is the head of a business empire and is known for his nefarious connections and illegal dealings. He is supported at every step by his friend and partner Seshu (Ashish Vidyarthi). Enters Kantri (Jr. NTR) who enters Pothuraju's gang to earn money for his orphanage where he grew up (he is orphaned at a very young age). Kantri falls in love with Varalakshmi (Hansika Motwani). However, she initially does not like Kantri. An ambitious Kantri rises up fast in life and meets Pothuraju in Hong Kong. However, an issue arises which separates Kantri from Pothuraju's gang. He takes money from Das (Sayaji Shinde) to kill Pothuraju. Before he has his chance to do so,  he is told that Pothuraju is actually his father. The hatred turns into attachment and Seshu's daughter Priya (Tanisha Mukherjee) falls in love with Kantri. However, some differences arise between PR and Seshu. How Kantri puts an end to all this and clears the confusion forms the rest of the story.

Cast 

 Jr. NTR as Kantri (Kranthi)
 Hansika Motwani as Varalakshmi / Hamsa
 Tanisha Mukherjee as Priya
 Prakash Raj as PR / Pothuraju
 Ashish Vidyarthi as Seshu
 Kota Srinivasa Rao as Daiva Sahayam
 Mukesh Rishi as Kantri's grandfather
 Sayaji Shinde as Das
 Brahmanandam as Brahmi
 Ali as Chang Lee
 Sunil as Rajni Haasan
 Murali Sharma as Veeru, (Gangster)
 Subbaraju as Bhyraagi
 Raghu Babu as Acid Durga
 Krishna Bhagawan as Singaporean Tour Guide
 Prudhviraj as Settlement Raju
 Gundu Hanumantha Rao as Devaraju
 Srinivasa Reddy as Cutting Seenu
 Prabhas Sreenu as Spider Reddy
 M. S. Narayana as Thelupu Ramakrishna
 Master Bharath as Rambo
 Hema
 G. V. Sudhakar Naidu

Production
I narrated the script of Kantri to Puri Jagan when we went to Manali to shoot Desamuduru for 30 days. He listened to the beginning scene, interval block and pre-climax and said that this film will become a hit. He also liked Kantri title and immediately registered it on Vaishno banner so that others won't squat on it.

Dutt observed me during that time and offered me a film. When he asked who I want to have as hero, I said NTR. I also told him that there will not be any thoda kottatam kind of things in this film. It is going to be stylish and it will showcase NTR in a 25-year-old tappori character. Dutt said that he would take 4 days to call me again. He called me right the next day and asked me to narrate it to NTR. I gave a 20-minute narration to NTR and I could see a glow in his face after listening to the script. The next day I got a call from NTR that the project is on. I narrated two more developed versions on 7 and 20 April. I had the entire script ready by that time. Whatever is there is movie today was there written in that bound script. The each and every scene in Kantri was approved by both Aswini Dutt and NTR before going to the sets.

I wanted to show NTR in a new look. We did a photo shoot and bought costumes from places around to make sure that each costume is not costlier than 1500 rupees. Deepa designed the costumes of NTR. We had all costumes ready even before the movie is started.

At that time Mani Sharma was in USA doing live concerts. Aswini Dutt made me travel there so that I could participate music sittings right away. I traveled along with Mani. 123 song was that first one he composed. I wanted to shoot a hip-hop song on NTR. We needed a lyricist and we did not have anybody around us. Hence I wrote the lyrics for that song. all the words in that song came from my observations on NTR – especially 'by birth undi timmiri'. I reserved a portion of the rendition to NTR. Mani Sharma composed three tunes in USA only.

We started the shoot of Kantri with a song on 1 October. We had to wait for a month because cinematographer Sameer Reddy was busy with Athidi at that time.

We had to shoot a vital portion of the film abroad. Aswini Dutt gave us an option to shoot in any country around the word. We finalized on Hong Kong and Dubai. But Hong Kong shoot costs 6 million more. When I put forth the budgets in front of Dutt, he selected Hong Kong. We shot the transit part in Singapore and action episodes in Hong Kong. Aswini Dutt also produced Ram Gopal Varma's Company in Hong Kong in the past. I could able to shoot 75% of what I had imagined in Hong Kong episodes. Sameer Reddy and Stun Shiva shot the entire portion efficiently. I showcased the skyline of Hong Kong effectively. We shot at an area where the latest version of Hollywood film Batman was shot a couple of days earlier. We also shot in a most dangerous airport strip in the middle of the city. Aswini Dutt also did not compromised on songs. We could have easily shot the songs in Singapore and Hong Kong. But he wanted us to go to other places. We went to Cape town in South Africa as no Telugu film was shot over there after Badri.

Music 

Released on 29 March 2008, Kantri'''s soundtrack was composed by Mani Sharma whilst lyrics were penned by five different lyricists: Meher Ramesh, Ananth Sreeram, Sirivennela, Veturi, and Ramajogayya Sastry. The song "123" is based on Get Buck. The song "Vayasunamy" was a remake of Sharma's previous song "Vasantha Mullai" from Pokkiri.

Reception

Rediff gave two and half stars said "Meher has nothing new to offer. He does take the beaten path in making a hero-centric film with the theme of good versus evil and the usual masala elements. NTR stands out with his looks and talent. Hansika, as the lead heroine makes a pretty picture. In short Kantri is NTR's show all the way". greatandhra and idlebrain rated three stars, with the former saying "The film is for mass cum class audiences. Technically the film stands on the summit. Leaving the length part and less-comedy part aside, the film is a well-made one", and the latter describing "The plus points of the film are NTR's energizing performance (dialogues, dances and emotions) and the first half. The twist towards climax is interesting".

Awards
Filmfare Awards South
 Filmfare Award for Best Dance Choreographer - South - Prem Rakshith for the song "Vayasunami"

Nandi Awards
Nandi Award for Best Choreographer – Prem Rakshit for the song "Vayasunami"

South Scope Awards
South Scope best stylish actor – Jr NTR
South Scope best stylish choreography – Raju Sundaram ("123 Nenoka Kantri")

Dubbed versions
The film was later dubbed and released in Hindi as Ek Aur Qayamat (2009) and in Tamil as Pokkiri Paiyan''.

References

External links
 

2008 films
2000s Telugu-language films
2008 action films
Indian action films
2000s masala films
Films scored by Mani Sharma
Films shot in Hong Kong
Films directed by Meher Ramesh